Chloe Fraser (born 20 September 1993) is a British professional racing cyclist from Scotland, who currently rides for UCI Women's Continental Team . From Dingwall, Fraser was the winner of the road race, at the 2015 Scottish Road Championships.

See also
 List of 2015 UCI Women's Teams and riders

References

External links

1993 births
Living people
Scottish female cyclists
Place of birth missing (living people)